Halfway (or Half Way) is an unincorporated community in  Allen County, Kentucky, United States.

A post office was established in the community in 1877. The place name Halfway (historically also spelled Half Way) is said to have referred to the town's location halfway between Bowling Green and the Tennessee state line on the horse-drawn mail route. The US Postal Service shows the Halfway post office as being in operation from 1928 until 1992, when service was suspended, and discontinued in 1997 when it was converted to a community post office of Scottsville, Kentucky.

References

Unincorporated communities in Allen County, Kentucky
Unincorporated communities in Kentucky